José Esteban Valle (5 September 1942 – 27 December 2004) was a Nicaraguan racewalker. He competed in the men's 20 kilometres walk at the 1968 Summer Olympics and the 1972 Summer Olympics.

References

External links

1942 births
2004 deaths
Athletes (track and field) at the 1968 Summer Olympics
Athletes (track and field) at the 1972 Summer Olympics
Athletes (track and field) at the 1967 Pan American Games
Athletes (track and field) at the 1975 Pan American Games
Nicaraguan male racewalkers
Olympic athletes of Nicaragua
Pan American Games competitors for Nicaragua